Witchingham Priory was a priory in Norfolk, England.

History
Walter Giffard, 1st Earl of Buckingham granted land to monks in Norfolk.

References

Monasteries in Norfolk